Hobart Krum (January 12, 1833 – May 4, 1914) was an American lawyer and politician from New York.

Life
He was born on January 12, 1833, in Fulton, Schoharie County, New York, the son of Jonas Krum (1790–1867) and Mary (Bixby) Krum (1793–1877). He attended the district schools, and worked on his father's farm. He graduated from the Union Free School in Chicopee Falls, Massachusetts. Then he studied law in South Worcester, was admitted to the bar in 1856, practiced for another year in South Worcester, and then settled in the village of Schoharie. He married Frances A. Washburn (1842–1909).

He was a delegate to the New York State Constitutional Convention of 1867–68; a delegate to the 1884, 1888 and 1892 Republican National Conventions; and a member of the New York State Republican Committee from 1890 to 1892.

On September 19, 1895, Krum was nominated for the State Senate by the Republican 27th senatorial district convention on the 486th ballot. He was a member of the New York State Senate (27th D.) from 1896 to 1902, sitting in the 119th, 120th, 121st, 122nd, 123rd, 124th and 125th New York State Legislatures.

He died on May 4, 1914, at his home in Schoharie, New York; and was buried at St. Paul's Lutheran Cemetery there.

Sources

External links

1833 births
1914 deaths
Republican Party New York (state) state senators
People from Fulton, Schoharie County, New York
People from Schoharie, New York
19th-century American politicians